Moawad GadElrab (15 September 1929 – 23 August 1983), Egyptian Physician also an artist, writer, author and professor of artistic anatomy in the Faculty of Art Education, Zamalek (Helwan University) in the 1950s and 1960s of the last century.

He also participated in several art exhibition, his paintings were acquired by many official bodies, some of his paintings were showcased in Kasr El Aini Hospital medical college.

Books 
Many of his works were adapted for a television play, his articles appeared regularly in the press alongside a weekly column in Watani newspaper.

 People and dogs was released by the national publishing and printing house in Cairo in 1964, contains many short stories, including The Demon, Another Women,  because my brother, Do not speed up the pace, a witness on the Nile,  the rest of life,  it's also For me, in the hand of God, the flesh of a friend, Sakka's daughter, the cup, I'll be back tomorrow, people and dogs, pictures from the past.

 "Jude Where is Your Master" and other stories

See also
List of Egyptian authors
List of Egyptian writers

References

Egyptian painters
Egyptian sculptors
Egyptian novelists
Egyptian Copts
Coptic painters
1929 births
1983 deaths
Qasr El Eyni Hospital